The 1981 Primera División de Fútbol Profesional season.  At the end of the regular season, the top 4 teams took part in a Final series.
FAS were named Champions after defeating Independiente 4–3 on penalties, after 1–1 draw.

Teams

Managerial changes

During the season

League standings

Playoffs

Semifinals 1st Leg

Semifinals 2nd Leg

Final

Top scorers

List of foreign players in the league
This is a list of foreign players in 1981 Seasons. The following players:
have played at least one apetura game for the respective club.
have not been capped for the El Salvador national football team on any level, independently from the birthplace

Atletico Marte
 None

C.D. Águila
 

Alianza F.C.
 

Chalatenango
 

FAS
  Manolo Alvarez

 (player released mid season)
  (player Injured mid season)
 Injury replacement player

Independiente
  Alan Marcos de Queiroz Marquinho
  Justino da Silva

Luis Ángel Firpo
 

Once Lobos
 

Santigueno
 

UES
  Harry Ramon Bran

External links
 

1981
1981–82 in Salvadoran football